Ronald A. Edmonds (born 1946 in Richmond, California) is a photojournalist who won the 1982 Pulitzer Prize in spot news photography for his coverage of the assassination attempt on President Ronald Reagan's life.

Edmonds has photographed every United States President from Richard Nixon through President Barack Obama. His assignments have included covering summits of world leaders, Presidential inaugurations, Space Shuttle launches, Super Bowls, Summer and Winter Olympics, political races, and most of the Republican and Democratic National Conventions since 1980. His work has appeared in publications around the world including Time, Newsweek, Paris Match, Stern, Sports Illustrated, Life, and People.

He began his first staff photographer job at the Honolulu Star-Bulletin, in Honolulu, Hawaii in 1972.  After five years he was promoted to Chief Photographer and traveled throughout the Pacific including American Samoa, the Hawaiian Islands, Midway Island, and Wake Island, covering assignments that included Emperor Hirohito's visit, Elvis Presley's world-wide televised concert, and the return of POW's from Vietnam through Wake Island.

Edmonds joined United Press International in 1978 as Newspicture Bureau Manager in Sacramento, California. His assignments for UPI included the Winter Olympics, NBA playoffs, NCAA basketball finals, and Presidential campaigns including Ronald Reagan's presidential campaign and inauguration in 1980.

Edmonds joined the Associated Press in Washington in 1981 and worked there until 2009, when he retired as the AP's Senior White House Photographer. He was one of the early pioneers of the use of digital cameras in news photography, including using an experimental electronic camera to transmit to newspapers around the world the first photos of President George H. W. Bush's inauguration, forty seconds after he put his hand down after being sworn in.

Awards

In 1981 Edmonds was awarded the Pulitzer Prize in spot news photography for his coverage of the assassination attempt on President Ronald Reagan's life on March 30, 1981.

Associated Press Managing Editors Award
Grand Diploma from the World Press Awards
Golden Eye Award, The World Press Association
Distinguished Service Award, Society of Professional Journalists
National Headliners Award for Spot News Photography
Awards from the White House News Photographers Association and the National Press Photographers Association

References

External links
 Ron Edmonds Official web page
 Ron Edmonds on YouTube

Living people
American photojournalists
Pulitzer Prize for Photography winners
1946 births